Robert Gordon Stokes (born 17 January 1975) is an Australian politician. Stokes is the New South Wales Minister for Infrastructure, the Minister for Cities, and the Minister for Active Transport in the Perrottet ministry since 21 December 2021. He is a member of the New South Wales Legislative Assembly representing Pittwater for the Liberal Party since 2007.

Stokes has previously served as the Minister for Infrastructure in the second Berejiklian ministry between April 2019 and December 2021; and temporarily served as the Minister for Transport and Roads in the Perrottet ministry between October and December 2021. He has also previously served as the Minister for Education from January 2017 until March 2019 in the First Berejiklian ministry; the Minister for the Environment, the Minister for Heritage, the Assistant Minister for Planning, and the Minister for the Central Coast during 2014 and 2015 in the first Baird government; and the Minister for Planning from April 2015 until January 2017 in the second Baird government.

Background and early career
Stokes grew up in Mona Vale. He attended fee-paying Sydney Church of England Grammar School (Shore) and obtained his Higher School Certificate in 1991. He obtained a Bachelor of Arts, a Bachelor of Laws, a Master of Laws and a PhD at Macquarie University; a Diploma of Biblical Studies, and a Graduate Diploma in Legal Practice.

Stokes was an associate with the law firm David Begg & Associates in Martin Place, Sydney. He also worked in a number of other legal firms including one at Mona Vale. He subsequently became a lecturer in the Division of Law at Macquarie University. He became a member of the Young Lawyers Association of New South Wales and was a member of both the Environmental Law and CLE Committees. He became a presidential nominee in 2004 and was elected to Executive Council at the 2004 Annual Assembly.

Political career
Stokes was a policy adviser to Liberal Opposition Leader John Brogden, the Member for Pittwater. When Brogden resigned in controversial circumstances, the 2005 by-election was won by independent candidate Alex McTaggart in what many described as a shock result. Pittwater had long been reckoned as a classic "blue ribbon" Liberal seat. Less than two years later, Stokes regained the seat for the Liberals at the 2007 general election. He won the seat with 50.3 per cent of the primary vote, just over the 50 per cent threshold required to win the seat outright, and 59.4 per cent of the vote on a two-party preferred basis.

After the election, Stokes established his electorate office in Mona Vale. Stokes paid tribute to John Brogden in his inaugural speech to the NSW Parliament on 31 May 2007.

At the 2011 general election, Stokes was re-elected with a swing of 21.7 points, gaining 84.5 per cent of the two-party vote. Stokes' main competitor was the Greens Jonathan King. Following the election, Stokes was appointed as NSW Parliamentary Secretary for Renewable Energy in the O'Farrell government.

Owing to the resignation of Barry O'Farrell as Premier, and the subsequent ministerial reshuffle by Mike Baird, the new Liberal Leader, Stokes was appointed as Minister for the Environment, Minister for Heritage, and Assistant Minister for Planning and appointed as a member of cabinet. Two weeks later, following the resignation of Mike Gallacher, Stokes was appointed as Minister for the Central Coast. Following the 2015 state election, Stokes was sworn in as the Minister for Planning on 2 April 2015 in the second Baird government. Following the resignation of Mike Baird as Premier, Gladys Berejiklian was elected as Liberal leader and sworn in as Premier. The first Berejiklian ministry was subsequently formed with Stokes sworn in as the Minister for Education with effect from 30 January 2017. Following the 2019 state election Stokes was appointed as the Minister for Planning and Public Spaces in the second Berejiklian ministry, with effect from 2 April 2019. Following the October 2021 resignation of Andrew Constance from the ministry, Stokes was sworn in as Minister for Transport and Roads, a position the he held, together with Planning and Public Spaces until December 2021. In the second rearrangement of the Perrottet ministry, Stokes was sworn in as Minister for Infrastructure, Minister for Cities, and Minister for Active Transport, with effect from December 2021.

See also

First Baird ministry
Second Baird ministry
First Berejiklian ministry
Second Berejiklian ministry
Perrottet ministry

References

 

Members of the New South Wales Legislative Assembly
Liberal Party of Australia members of the Parliament of New South Wales
1975 births
Living people
Politicians from Sydney
Macquarie University alumni
Macquarie Law School alumni
21st-century Australian politicians